Senzo Brikka Vilakazi (born 11 August 1988) known professionally as Kwesta, is a South African rapper and songwriter. 
Born in Katlehong, Gauteng, a township also known as "K1". In 2003, at the age of 15, he and his friends formed a rap group Ghetto Fellaz which then changed to The Juvenylz, same year.
He is currently signed to his own independent media company known as RapLyf Records with co-founder Kid X.

He released his debut studio album Special ReKwest (2010) and his second album DaKAR (2013), which peaked number 3 on the iTunes South African Hip-hop/Rap chart.

Kwesta's third studio album, DaKAR II (2016), spawned with singles includes; "Ngud'," "Nomayini", "Day One", "Ngiyazifela Ngawe," "Mayibabo" and "Mmino". The album was certified 7× Platinum by the Recording Industry of South Africa (RISA).
Having sold 210 000 copies in South Africa, DaKAR II became best selling hip hop albums of all-time.

His fifth studio album g.o.d Guluva (2021), which debuted number 3 in South Africa.

His most reputable accolades include 6 South African Music Awards, 4 South African Hip Hop Awards, 1 MTV Africa Music Awards, and 1 Metro FM Awards.

Life and career

Kwesta attended Phumlani Secondary School in Katlehong for three years, and later Alafang Secondary School.

He developed an interest in poetry during his high school years and received positive feedback and encouragement from fellow students and teachers.

In 2003, Kwesta became a part of the group The Ghetto Fellas later known as The Juvenylz. The group disbanded after two years.

After the group's disbandment, Kwesta made an agreement with Africa's Most Southern Record Company for the use of their studios. During this time, Kwesta participated in competitions and events to provide visibility for his brand. He took part in YFM's Rap Activity Jam MC of the Month competition. He topped ETV's Shiz Niz Freestyle Kings Special. Also, he performed at The Rand Show, Miss Confidence Show and The Durban Beach Festival.

The rapper dropped out of high school at the age of 16. After which he convinced his mother to give him the taxi fare necessary to get to Buttabing Entertainment's offices. The meeting resulted in him being added to the record label's roster marking the beginning of his signed career.

Career beginnings
In 2007, Kwesta earned a judging gig on the Sprite Hip Hoop Tour and a feature on The Ventilation Street Tape. He was also part of The Nokia Defend Your Street Campaign, where he worked with other artists to create the theme song.

In the same year, Kwesta released his inaugural single Sharp Fede. He later released a mixtape in collaboration with DJ C-Live.

In 2010, Kwesta was among the few chosen as Brand SA Ambassadors. He performed during the national roadshows held before the 2010 FIFA World Cup hosted in South Africa. Kwesta worked alongside Kelly Rowland, Jozi, and 2Face amongst other artist on the Everywhere You Go anthem for MTN. He also performed during the 2010 FIFA World Cup closing ceremony.

20102012: Special Rekwest 
In September 2010, Kwesta released debut studio album titled Special Rekwest. The album featured hit singles such as Babhemi, Flash It, Stomp and Pump It.

Flava received a synch-deal with DStv and got featured in the Loeries TV's 2011, ad-campaign.

Pump It received a synch-deal with DStv and Redds.

Stomp was one of the soundtracks for Death Race 3, an America action movie.

With the success of the album, Kwesta became South Africa's first rapper to have seven songs ranked on multiple radio charts in the same year. Special Rekwest earned SAMA nominations in 2011 for Best Newcomer and Best Rap Album.

20132015: DaKAR 
On 25 November 2013, Kwesta released his second studio album titled DaKAR (Da King of Afrikan Rap). The album ranked third on the South African iTunes Hip-Hop Charts during its debut.

20162019: DaKAR II 
In 2016, Kwesta released his third studio album titled DaKAR II. On 18 January 2016,  Ngud' was released featuring, Cassper Nyovest.

At annual MTV Africa Music Awards, the single "Ngud'" received a nominations for the song of the Year. In early October 2017, his single "Spirit" featuring the American rapper Wale was released. The song was certified platinum by Recording Industry of South Africa (RiSA).

On 26 April 2018,  DaKAR II was certified 7× Platinum by the Recording Industry of South Africa (RiSA).

2021present: g.o.d guluva
In March 2021, his single "Fire In The Ghetto" featuring Troublle was released, as album's lead single. In early April 2021, pre-order were made available.

On 30 April 2021, Kwesta released his fourth studio album, titled g.o.d guluva [acronym for "ghost of dakar"]. The cover art was made by the famous Nelson Makamo. The album features South Africa artists Thabsie, Focalistic, TLT, Yanga Chief, K.O. The album peaked No. 4 in South Africa Top 100 Albums, and received generally positive reviews from music critics.

At the 2021 Mzansi Kwaito and House Music Awards, his single "Njandini" won the award for the best Best Kwaito song.

Discography

Studio albums

Notable singles

Awards

References

1988 births
Living people
People from Katlehong
South African rappers
South African hip hop musicians